The Book Thief may refer to:

Literature
The Book Thief, written by Markus Zusak
The Thief, written by Clive Cussler and Justin Scott

Film
The Book Thief, a film based on the Zusak book directed by Brian Percival

See also
The Magic Thief, written by Sarah Prineas
A Thief in the Night, written by John Cornwell